Racketeers of the Range is a 1939 American Western film directed by D. Ross Lederman from a screenplay by Oliver Drake, based on Bernard McConville's story. Produced and distributed by RKO Radio Pictures, the film was released on May 26, 1939. and stars George O'Brien, Chill Wills, and Marjorie Reynolds.

Plot
Helen Lewis has inherited her father's small, independent meat packing plant; however, her attorney, Roger Whitlock, plans to sell her out to a large packing company. Barney O'Dell, the area's largest cattle ranch owner, knows if Helen is forced to sell her business, the larger company will have a monopoly and the cattle ranchers won't be able to freely market their beef. As chief creditor, Barney takes control of Helen's plant and all the local ranchers combine their livestock for Barney to ship. However, Whitlock and his gang rustle the herd. Barney and his cowhands intervene and retrieve the cattle, now piled into cattle trucks. After the cattle are transferred onto a train for shipment, Whitlock and his gang steal the train. Barney gives pursuit, boards the train, throws the rustlers off one by one during a gunfight, and subdues Whitlock who is holding Helen in the caboose. Barney frees Helen and the two sit together on the back of the caboose landing.

Cast
 George O'Brien as Barney O'Dell
 Chill Wills as Whopper Hatch
 Marjorie Reynolds as Helen Lewis
 Gay Seabrook as Penny Jones
 Robert Fiske as Roger Whitlock
 John Dilson as William J. Benson
 Monte Montague as Joe Larkin
 Bud Osborne as Hank
 Ben Corbett as Dutch
 Ray Whitley as Ray Whitley
 Cactus Mack as Flash Gilbert
 Frankie Marvin as Skeeter Potts

References

External links
 

1939 films
American Western (genre) films
1939 Western (genre) films
RKO Pictures films
Films directed by D. Ross Lederman
1930s English-language films
American black-and-white films
Films produced by Bert Gilroy
1930s American films